Tanisha Gets Married is an American reality documentary television series that premiered on May 7, 2012 on Oxygen. The eight-part wedding special featured Bad Girls Club cast member Tanisha Thomas and her husband as they prepare for their wedding ceremony.

Premise
The series follows Bad Girls Club season-two cast member Tanisha Thomas as she prepares for her wedding. With preparations for the wedding in order, tensions rise between Tanisha and her soon-to-be husband Clive. Other former "Bad Girls" cast members make several appearances on the show. The series also focuses on tensions between Natalie and Florina, and how their actions could have ruined Tanisha's big day.

Cast
 Tanisha Thomas: Bride
 Clive Muir: Groom
 Lydia Thomas: Tanisha's mother
 Arkeen McGuire: Maid of Honor and cousin  
 Florina Kaja: Bridesmaid (former Bad Girl, Season 4)
 Natalie Nunn: Bridesmaid (former Bad Girl, Season 4)
 Amber Meade: Bridesmaid (former Bad Girl, Season 4)
 Wilmarie Sena: Guest (former Bad Girl, Season 6)
 Bella Reimers: Bridesmaid
 Sean: Best friend and groomsman
 Darnell: Best friend and groomsman

Episodes

References

External links

 
 
 

2012 American television series debuts
2010s American reality television series
2012 American television series endings
Television shows set in New York City
English-language television shows
African-American reality television series
Oxygen (TV channel) original programming
American television spin-offs
Reality television spin-offs
Wedding television shows